The 1945 Vanderbilt Commodores football team represented Vanderbilt University during the 1945 college football season.

Schedule

References

Vanderbilt
Vanderbilt Commodores football seasons
Vanderbilt Commodores football